The Philippines has been competing at the Deaflympics since the 2009 edition. The country is represented by the Phil Sports Federation of the Deaf (PSFD).

Athletes representing the country in the Deaflympics has never won a medal. The Philippines has yet to participate in the Winter Deaflympic Games.

Summary

All-time medal tally 
Ranking is based on total gold medals earned.

Participation history

2009 Summer Deaflympics
The PSFD decided to initially focused on bowling and sent a delegation of six bowlers at the 2009 Summer Deaflympics. This is due to the president of the organization at that time, Maria Lovella Catalan, for being known as a player in bowling both in deaf and hearing variants of the sport. Catalan herself competed.

Bowling
Maria Lovella Catalan
Jorrelle Faytaren
Ariscel Lobo
Anthony Pacis
Christopher Uy
Maria Cecilia Villacin

2013 Summer Deaflympics
Two of the six debutants in the 2009 Deaflympics; Catalan and Lobo, returned to compete in the 2013 edition.

Bowling
Maria Lovella Catalan
Ariscel Lobo

2017 Summer Deaflympics
The Philippines sent a lone athlete in the 2017 edition. The country competed in table tennis for the first time in the Deaflympics.
Table tennis
Abrianne Nuevo

See also 
Philippines at the Paralympics
Philippines at the Olympics

References 

Nations at the Deaflympics
Deaflympics
Deaflympics
Deaf culture in the Philippines